My Wife is a Gangster 3 is a 2006 Korean film. It is a sequel to My Wife is a Gangster 2.

Despite bearing the My Wife is a Gangster title, the film has little to no relation to the previous films.

Plot 
Korean gangster Han Ki-Chul (Lee Beom-soo) is put in charge by his Big Boss of looking after Lim Aryong (Shu Qi) who comes from Hong Kong. They expect Lim Aryong to be some big male gangster but she turns out to be a woman and acts very cold toward him and his associates. Moreover, none of them speak her language and she doesn't understand Korean. A translator called Yeon-Hee (Hyun Young) arrives. She is immature and very scared of the gangsters so at the beginning, instead of translating Aryong's rather rude answers, she changes them to nice ones. Quickly, Aryong shows her fierce fighting skills beating other bosses to save her companions. Ki-Chul and his associates, who are rather unskilled, are impressed and become afraid of her while, upon finding that they are actually nice, she's trying to be more friendly. Her efforts are ruined by Yeon-Hee who, taking advantage of Aryong's fearsome aura, 'translates' very threatening sentences.

Soon after, they are attacked by professional assassins. They think that they are after Ki-Chul while, in fact, they want to kill Aryong who is the daughter of a boss in Hong Kong and is accused of having killed another boss, triggering a gangster war there. They then separate and Aryong and Ki-Chul's car is chased by the assassins but they manage to take refuge in his family. His parents believe that she is his girlfriend and give him a family necklace to give her. The assassins find her again but she overcomes them, especially the woman who really killed the boss. She then goes to meet her mother who is the reason why she chose to hide in Korea, but seeing that she found a new family and is happy, she gives up speaking to her.

After that, she leaves Korea despite Ki-Chul's confession, even if she accepts the necklace. In Hong Kong, her father (Ti Lung) dies from his injuries caused by an explosion decided by the other boss. Even though Ki-Chul comes to support her, she leaves to take revenge. She then fights the other boss's gangsters with success and eventually she faces the boss. After cheating, he was going to shoot her as Ki-Chul arrives, distracting him. The boss shoots Ki-Chul first, allowing Aryong to come close to him and to kill him. Ki-Chul is not dead but is going to leave Hong Kong. Aryong, after becoming the new boss, succeeding her father, is advised by her father's right-hand man not to let him leave, as did her father who let her mother leave and then regretted it all his life. She follows the advice, stopping him on his way to the airport with all her gangsters and proposes to Ki-Chul, the right-hand man making the translation (not always a very accurate one, like Yeon-Hee). Ki-Chul accepts it and they embrace on the motorway.

Cast 
 Shu Qi as Lim Yaling
 Lee Beom-soo as Ki-chul (Hangul: 기철, Gi-cheol)
 Hyun Young as Yeon-hee (Hangul: 연희, Yeon-hui)
 Oh Ji-ho as Pacific Saury
 Ti Lung as Chairman Im (special appearance)

References

External links 
 
 
 
 My Wife is a Gangster 3  Cine21 

2006 films
South Korean action comedy films
South Korean gangster films
2000s Korean-language films
Films about organized crime in South Korea
Films directed by Jo Jin-kyu
South Korean crime comedy films
South Korean sequel films
South Korean films remade in other languages
2000s action comedy films
2000s crime comedy films
Triad films
2000s South Korean films
2000s Hong Kong films